The men's team sabre competition at the 2002 Asian Games in Busan, South Korea was held on 4 October 2002 at the Gangseo Gymnasium.

Schedule
All times are Korea Standard Time (UTC+09:00)

Results
Legend
WO — Won by walkover

Final standing

References
2002 Asian Games Report, Page 407

External links
 Official website

Men sabre